is a community and former town, currently part of Sanuki City, Kagawa Prefecture, Japan. It lies in the eastern part of the prefecture facing the Seto Inland Sea.

Tsuda was designated a village in 1890, upgraded to a town in 1898, and merged with Tsuruwa to the east in 1956.

References

Dissolved municipalities of Kagawa Prefecture
Sanuki, Kagawa